A needlecase or needle case is a small, often decorative, holder for sewing needles. Early needlecases were usually small tubular containers of bone, wood, or bronze with tight-fitting stoppers, often designed to hang from a belt.  Needlecases are sometimes called by the French name étui and are typically one of the tools attached to a chatelaine. A pin poppet is a similar container for pins, common in the 18th century.

History 
Early sewing needles were precious items and easily lost. Needlecases were a necessity for storing these fragile objects, and are found in cultures around the world. Tubular bronze needlecases are common finds from Viking-age sites in Europe. Cane needlecases were found in a grave from Cerro Azul, Peru, dated to 1000–1470 AD. Bone, leather and metal needlecases have been found from Medieval London, and bone or ivory needlecases were made by Inuit. Bone and ivory needlecases and pin poppets were also popular in 18th century America.

Elaborate needlework confections like the frog-shaped needlecase in the Los Angeles County Museum of Art appeared by the 16th century. Heavily decorated silver and brass needlecases are typical of the Victorian period. 

Between 1869 and 1887, W. Avery & Son, an English needle manufactory, produced a series of figural brass needlecases, which are now highly collectible.  Avery's dominance of this market was such that all similar brass Victorian needlecases are called "Averys".

Gallery

References

External links 

 Needlecases in museum collections
 Inuit Art: Needle cases, Canadian Museum of History
 Mongolian/Tibetan silver needlecase, 19th century, McClung Museum
 Carved wooden needlecase, 15th century Flanders, Hermitage Museum
 Needlecase with hanging loops, 1550-1680, Museum of London

Sewing equipment